Dunedinia is a genus of South Pacific dwarf spiders that was first described by Alfred Frank Millidge in 1988.

Species
 it contains five species:
Dunedinia decolor Millidge, 1988 – New Zealand
Dunedinia denticulata Millidge, 1988 (type) – New Zealand
Dunedinia occidentalis Millidge, 1993 – Australia (Western Australia)
Dunedinia opaca Millidge, 1993 – Australia (South Australia)
Dunedinia pullata Millidge, 1988 – New Zealand

See also
 List of Linyphiidae species (A–H)

References

Araneomorphae genera
Linyphiidae
Spiders of Australia
Spiders of New Zealand